Pyotr Alexandrovich Pletnyov (Tebleshi, Tver Governorate — ) was a minor Russian poet and literary critic, who rose to become the dean of the Saint Petersburg University (1840–61) and academician of the Petersburg Academy of Sciences (1841).

Pletnyov befriended the poet Alexander Pushkin, who dedicated his novel in verse Eugene Onegin to him. After Pushkin's death in 1837, Pletnyov edited his literary journal Sovremennik until the latter was sold to Nikolai Nekrasov in 1846. As a critic, he was strongly opposed to Vissarion Belinsky and like-minded journalists who placed "progressive ideas" above the artistic mastership.

With Sergey Uvarov's support, Pletnyov gained many teaching assignments, in and around  Saint Petersburg, including in the end a tutor's post to the future Alexander II. His non-partisan view of various literary movements helped him to single out and applaud all of the most gifted writers of the day, from Vasily Zhukovsky through Nikolai Gogol to Fyodor Dostoevsky.

1792 births
1865 deaths
People from Bezhetsky District
People from Bezhetsky Uyezd
Poets from the Russian Empire
Russian male poets
Philologists from the Russian Empire
Journalists from the Russian Empire
Russian male journalists
Male writers from the Russian Empire
Full members of the Saint Petersburg Academy of Sciences
19th-century writers from the Russian Empire
19th-century poets
19th-century male writers from the Russian Empire
Burials at Tikhvin Cemetery